Paul Schweda (5 March 1930 – 20 December 2010) was an Austrian footballer. He played in three matches for the Austria national football team from 1952 to 1953. Schweda played club football for FK Austria Wien.

References

External links
 

1930 births
2010 deaths
Austrian footballers
Austria international footballers
Place of birth missing
Association footballers not categorized by position